Ecteniniidae is an extinct family of probainognathian cynodonts from the Triassic of South America. They are notable for their large size, as well as for being among the first synapsids with specializations towards cursoriality.

Phylogeny
Below is a cladogram from Martínez et al. (2013):

References

Prehistoric probainognathians
Late Triassic first appearances
Late Triassic extinctions
Prehistoric therapsid families